Tricholoma venenatum is a mushroom of the agaric genus Tricholoma. It was first described scientifically by American mycologist George F. Atkinson in 1908.

See also
List of North American Tricholoma

References

External links
 

Fungi described in 1908
Fungi of North America
Poisonous fungi
venenatum